Mitterhorn (elevation ) is a summit in the Steinernes Meer of the Berchtesgaden Alps in the Austrian state of Salzburg.

Alpinism 
The Mitterhorn can be reached both from the neighboring Persailhorn to the West or the Breithorn to the South as a popular Via Ferrata B-C across the three summits, starting either from Wiechenthaler Hut (Wiechenthaler Hütte) or Riemann Hut (Riemannhütte).

Mountains of the Alps
Two-thousanders of Austria